Alden Šuvalija (born 3 March 2002) is a Bosnian professional footballer who currently plays for FC ViOn Zlaté Moravce as a centre-back, on loan from 1. FC Slovácko.

Club career

FC ViOn Zlaté Moravce
Šuvalija joined Slovak side during summer 2022 on a season-loan, from Czech club 1. FC Slovácko. He made his professional Fortuna Liga debut for ViOn Zlaté Moravce against DAC Dunajská Streda on 31 July 2022.

References

External links
 FC ViOn Zlaté Moravce official club profile 
 
 Futbalnet profile 
 

2002 births
Living people
Sportspeople from Sarajevo
Bosnia and Herzegovina footballers
Bosnia and Herzegovina youth international footballers
Association football defenders
1. FC Slovácko players
FC ViOn Zlaté Moravce players
Slovak Super Liga players
Expatriate footballers in Slovakia
Bosnia and Herzegovina expatriate footballers
Expatriate footballers in Croatia
Expatriate footballers in Portugal
Expatriate footballers in the Czech Republic
Bosnia and Herzegovina expatriate sportspeople in Croatia
Bosnia and Herzegovina expatriate sportspeople in Portugal
Bosnia and Herzegovina expatriate sportspeople in the Czech Republic
Bosnia and Herzegovina expatriate sportspeople in Slovakia